TOT Sport Club is a Thai defunct football club based in Lak Si district in northern Bangkok which represents the national telecommunications company, TOT Public Company Limited. TOT originally stands for the Telephone Organization of Thailand, the former name of the company at the time before their privatization. TOT's football team is a member of Football Association of Thailand (FAT) and a co-founder of the Thai Premier League. TOT S.C. was dissolved in 2016.

History

TOT SC is a founding member of the Thai Premier League in 1996/97 season and came second in the regular-season championship but was defeated by Bangkok Bank F.C. in the semi-final Championship Playoffs. This has so far proved to be TOT's best campaign.

Besides being relegated to the Thailand Division 1 League in 2003, they have more or less been a middle-ranking team, yet to break into the top four since 1996/97. They have been relegated on two occasions, bouncing back to the top flight at the first time of asking and claiming the Division One championship in the 2003/04 season.

Notable other achievements have been winning the Thai FA Cup in 1993 and the now-defunct Pro League in 2006 with their reserve team.

The accomplishment in the early days of the club is honorably credited to the first well-known coach Pongphan Wongsuwan.

Ownership dispute
In 2010 the club was taken over by Piroj Suwannachavee and renamed the team as TOT-CAT FC. CAT Telecom, another Thai government telecommunication company, joint the club namely as an owner. In 2011 The Football Association of Thailand (FAT) and Thai Premier League (TPL) were called to settle a dispute between original owners TOT and the newly formed TOT-CAT FC. They ruled in favor of TOT and the club will revert to the original. Presently TOT changes their football club's name officially to TOT SC (TOT Sport Club).

Club home

At the start of the 2009 season, TOT relocated from the central Nonthaburi province to the Western Kanchanaburi province to try and generate a bigger fan base.

They left their previous Namkaejon Stadium for the 13,000 capacity Kleab Bua Stadium, which would be used as their home stadium from 2009 onwards.

By the way, they stayed in Kanchanaburi province only lasted one season and then returned to Nonthaburi province to ground share with Muangthong United F.C. at the Yamaha Stadium (SCG Stadium currently). The move failed to attract new supporters and TOT-CAT fans were regularly outnumbered by the away support at their home games during the 2010 Thai Premier League. They used the Yamaha Stadium as a home until the end of the first leg of TPL 2011.

After a few years of construction, their newly 5000-seat stadium called TOT Stadium (located in TOT HQ., Laksi District) is completed and ready for use as the home stadium since the TPL 2011 second leg. The club training ground and club office is located at TOT Training Center or TOT Academy in Nonthaburi province around 15 kilometers away from their home stadium.

Asian competition

TOT has played in Asian competition only once, representing Thailand in the 1994–95 Asian Cup Winners' Cup after winning the 1993 Thai FA Cup. In the first round, they met East Bengal of India, dispatching them 4–1 in the first leg; they were awarded a walkover tie in the return when East Bengal withdrew. In the second round, they met Vietnamese opposition Quang Nam Danang, winning through 8–2 over two legs. In the last round, before East Asia met West Asia, TOT came up against Kuala Lumpur FA of Malaysia. This was a much tougher match and they came through in extra time. This took TOT through to the semi-finals, held in the UAE, where they met Japanese powerhouse Yokohama Flügels. Flügels defeated TOT 4–2 in the one-legged neutral-venue matchup. But, TOT still had one game to go in the third/fourth-place match against not only Saudi giants, but Asian giants Al Ittihad. The match went to penalties, with Ittihad winning 4–2.

Honours
 Thailand Division 1 League: 2003
 Thailand FA Cup: 1993
 Provincial League: 2006

Performance in AFC competitions
 Asian Cup Winners Cup:
1995: Fourth place

Stadium and locations by season records

Season by season domestic record

P = Played
W = Games won
D = Games drawn
L = Games lost
F = Goals for
A = Goals against
Pts = Points
Pos = Final position
N/A = No answer

TPL = Thai Premier League

QR1 = First Qualifying Round
QR2 = Second Qualifying Round
QR3 = Third Qualifying Round
QR4 = Fourth Qualifying Round
RInt = Intermediate Round
R1 = Round 1
R2 = Round 2
R3 = Round 3

R4 = Round 4
R5 = Round 5
R6 = Round 6
GR = Group stage
QF = Quarter-finals
SF = Semi-finals
RU = Runners-up
S = Shared
W = Winners

Coaches
Coaches by Years (1988–present)

References

External links
 Official Website
 Official Facebook

 
Defunct football clubs in Thailand
Football clubs in Thailand
Association football clubs established in 1954
1954 establishments in Thailand
Sport in Bangkok
Association football clubs disestablished in 2016
2016 disestablishments in Thailand